Old hat could refer to: 

 The 1972 song "Old Hat" from the album Uncle Dog by the group of the same name
 The 1997 song "Old Hat" from the album Where Have All the Merrymakers Gone? by Harvey Danger
 Old Hat Stakes, an annual horse race in Florida
 Old Hat, a 1960s race horse for which the Old Hat Stakes are named